The cavity method is a mathematical method presented by Marc Mézard, Giorgio Parisi and Miguel Angel Virasoro in 1987 to solve some mean field type models in statistical physics, specially adapted to disordered systems. The method has been used to compute properties of ground states in many condensed matter and optimization problems.

Initially invented to deal with the Sherrington–Kirkpatrick model of spin glasses, the cavity method has shown wider applicability. It can be regarded as a generalization of the Bethe—Peierls iterative method in tree-like graphs, to the case of a graph with loops that are not too short. The different approximations that can be done with the cavity method are usually named after their equivalent with the different steps of the replica method which is mathematically more subtle and less intuitive than the cavity approach.

The cavity method has proved useful in the solution of optimization problems such as k-satisfiability and graph coloring. It has yielded not only ground states energy predictions in the average case, but also has inspired algorithmic methods.

See also

The cavity method originated in the context of statistical physics, but is also closely related to methods from other areas such as belief propagation.

References

Further reading
 
 
 
 
 

Condensed matter physics